Jerome Gavis was a scientist and professor who served as the chairman of the chemical engineering department at Johns Hopkins University. He helped develop methods of separating solid waste components. He was a member of the National Academy of Sciences.  He earned a bachelor's degree in chemical engineering from New York University Tandon School of Engineering and a doctorate in chemistry from Cornell University. Gavis died on February 8, 2011, at the age of 82.

References

Polytechnic Institute of New York University alumni
Cornell University alumni
Members of the United States National Academy of Sciences
Year of birth missing
2011 deaths